Violet is an unincorporated community in eastern Polk County, Missouri.

The community is on Missouri Route AA, about six miles northeast of Bolivar.

History
A post office called Violet was established in 1896 and remained in operation until 1922. The community has the name of a woman named Violet.

References

Unincorporated communities in Polk County, Missouri
Unincorporated communities in Missouri